S. andrewi  may refer to:
 Sinployea andrewi, a land gastropod of the genus Sinployea
 Strymon andrewi, a butterfly of the genus Strymon

See also
 Andrewi (disambiguation)